Silverback Cargo Freighters is a cargo airline based in Kigali, Rwanda.

Banned Status
Because of safety reasons, Silverback Cargo Freighters was on the list of air carriers banned in the EU.

Destinations
Silverback Cargo Freighters served the following destinations (at September 2008):

Africa
Burundi
Bujumbura (Bujumbura International Airport)
Chad
N'Djamena (N'Djamena International Airport)
Democratic Republic of the Congo
Kinshasa (N'djili Airport)
Lubumbashi (Lubumbashi International Airport)
Ethiopia
Addis Ababa (Bole International Airport) Focus City
Ghana
Accra (Kotoka International Airport)
Liberia
Monrovia (Roberts International Airport)
Nigeria
Lagos (Murtala Muhammed International Airport)
Rwanda
Kigali (Kigali International Airport) Hub
South Africa
Johannesburg (OR Tambo International Airport)
Sudan
Khartoum (Khartoum International Airport)
Tanzania
Mwanza (Mwanza Airport)
Togo
Lomé (Lomé-Tokoin Airport)
Uganda
Entebbe (Entebbe International Airport)

Asia
Afghanistan
Kabul (Kabul International Airport)
India
Mumbai (Chhatrapati Shivaji International Airport)
Saudi Arabia
Jeddah (King Abdulaziz International Airport) Focus City
United Arab Emirates
Dubai (Dubai International Airport) Focus City
Malaysia
Kuala Lumpur (Kuala Lumpur International Airport) Focus City

Fleet
Silverback Cargo Freighters fleet consisted of the following aircraft (as of September 2008):

Current fleet and destinations 
The airline has regional routes around Africa and some longer-haul routes to: Dubai, Jeddah, Mumbai and Istanbul.

As of November 2018 Silver Cargo Freighters has the Following aircraft:

References

External links
 Route map

Defunct airlines of Rwanda
Defunct cargo airlines
Airlines established in 2002
Airlines disestablished in 2009
Organisations based in Kigali
Economy of Kigali